Marktl is the name of the following places:

Marktl in Upper Bavaria, Germany
a cadastral community of the municipality Straden in Styria, Austria
a cadastral community of the municipality Lilienfeld in Lower Austria, Austria